Rocco Morabito (November 2, 1920 – April 5, 2009) was an American photographer who spent the majority of his career at the Jacksonville Journal.

Morabito, born in Port Chester, New York, moved to Florida when he was 5, and by age 10 was working as a newsboy, selling papers for the Jacksonville Journal. He served in World War II in the Army Air Forces as a ball-turret gunner on a B-17. After the war, he returned to the Jacksonville Journal and started his photography career shooting sporting events for the paper. He worked for the Journal for 42 years, 33 of them as a photographer, until retiring in 1982.

The news photographer won the 1968 Pulitzer Prize for Spot News Photography for "The Kiss of Life", a Jacksonville Journal photo that showed mouth-to-mouth resuscitation between two workers on a utility pole. Randall G. Champion was unconscious and hanging upside down after contacting a low voltage line; fellow lineman J.D. Thompson revived him while strapped to the pole by the waist. Thanks to Thompson's intervention, Champion survived and lived until 2002, when he died of heart failure at the age of 64; Thompson was still living as of 2017.

Morabito died on April 5, 2009 while in hospice care.

References

1920 births
2009 deaths
20th-century American photographers
Artists from Jacksonville, Florida
People from Port Chester, New York
Pulitzer Prize for Photography winners
United States Army Air Forces personnel of World War II
United States Army Air Forces soldiers